Eudicella gralli, sometimes called the flamboyant flower beetle or striped love beetle, is a brightly coloured member of the scarab beetle family, in the subfamily known as flower beetles. Their shells seem to have a prismatic quality, refracting the ambient light to give the green of their carapace a rainbow tint. This species of flower beetle lives in the rainforests of Africa, where it feeds on the nectar and pollen of flowers, but is popular in the exotic pet trade. The larvae of the flower beetle live in decaying wood, feeding on dead wood and leaf litter. As in other species of this genus, the males have a "Y"-shaped horn, used to fight over females. The females have a shovel-like tusk, used for burrowing in wood. During their gestation period they will dig into the wood and lay eggs.

Further reading
Vincent Allard, 1985 - The Beetles of the World, volume 6. Goliathini 2 (Cetoniidae), Sciences Nat, Venette 
Vincent Allard, 1985 - Réhabilitation de Eudicella gralli pauperata Kolbe, bona species, (nec trilineata Quedf.) (Cetoniidae), Bulletin de la Société Sciences Nat, 46, p. 11.
Vincent Allard, 1985 - Réflexions sur la classification des groupes gralli et smithi du genre Eudicella White (Cetoniidae), Bulletin de la Société Sciences Nat, 47, p. 27.

External links
Eudicella gralli elgonensis photos at Beetlespace.wz.cz
Eudicella gralli hubini photos at Beetlespace.wz.cz
Natural Worlds

Cetoniinae
Beetles of Africa
Beetles described in 1836